Malkajgiri is a suburb in Hyderabad, India

Malkajgiri may also refer to:
 Malkajgiri mandal
 Malkajgiri district
 Malkajgiri Revenue Division
 Malkajgiri (Lok Sabha constituency)
 Malkajgiri (Assembly constituency)
 Malkajgiri railway station